The 1929 Frankford Yellow Jackets season was their sixth in the National Football League. The team failed to improve on their previous league output of 11–3–2, winning only ten games, losing four, and tying five. They finished third in the league standings.

Schedule

Standings

References

Frankford Yellow Jackets seasons
Frankford Yellow Jackets